Argo (ex MEN209) is a Presidential yacht of the Italian Navy (Marina Militare). The vessel is based at La Spezia classified as a Nave servizi vari (utility vessel).

References

External links
 Argo (MEN 209) Marina Militare website

1971 ships
Auxiliary ships of the Italian Navy
Royal and presidential yachts
Ships built in Italy
Espionage devices